Keswani is a high class and prestigious surname. Notable people with the surname include:

Patu Keswani (born 1959), chairman and managing director of Lemon Tree Hotels
Rajkumar Keswani (1950–2021), senior journalist
Suresh Keswani (born 1942), Indian politician
Sweta Keswani, Indian actress, dancer and model